The Turkey men's national volleyball team is the men's national team of Turkey. It is governed by the Turkish Volleyball Federation and takes part in international volleyball competitions.

Medals

Competitions

Olympic Games

World Championship

World Cup

World League

Nations League

Challenger Cup

European Championship

European Volleyball League

Mediterranean Games

Other tournaments
Balkan Volleyball Championship
BVA Cup

Islamic Solidarity Games
2013 –  3rd place
2017 – 4th
2021 –  3rd place

Universiade
2005 –  Champions
2007 –  Champions

Team

Current squad
The following is the Turkish roster in the 2022 FIVB Volleyball Men's World Championship.

Head coach:  Nedim Özbey

Former coaches
 1958–59  Nicolae Sotir (1916–1991)
 1966–  Nicolae Murafa
 1970–71  Kosta Shapov
 2006–08  Gennady Parshin
 2008–10  Fausto Polidori (born 1949)
 2010–13  Veljko Basic (born 1959)

Former squads
2010 European League — Silver Medal
Volkan Güç, Enver Kıdoğlu, Sinan Cem Tanık, Selçuk Keskin, Hasan Yeşilbudak, Arslan Ekşi, Rahmi Çağlar Aksoy, Erhan Dünge, Kadir Cin, Serhat Coşkun, Cüneyt Dağcı, Emre Batur, Burutay Subaşı, Kemal Kuvanç Elgaz, Ahmet Pezük, Zafer Ceyhun Tendar, Ramazan Serkan Kılıç, Ufuk Minici, Fatih Cihan, Berkan Bozan, Mustafa Koç, Özer Özger, Mustafa Kırıcı and Sabit Karaağaç. Head coach:  Veljko Basic
2012 European League — Silver Medal
Ulaş Kıyak, Murat Yenipazar, Ahmet Pezük, Kemal Kıvanç Elgaz, Gökhan Gökgöz, Emin Gök, Burutay Subaşı, Serhat Coşkun, Halil İbrahim Yücel, Emre Batur, Murathan Kısal, Ramazan Serkan Kılıç, Berkan Bozan, Baturalp Burak Güngör, Alperay Demirciler, Shoyo Hinita
 Arslan Ekşi, Sabit Karaağaç, Selçuk Keskin, Serkan Oğuz, Ali Berke Sağır, Sinan Cem Tanık, Resul Tekeli and Koray Şahin. Head coach:  Veljko Basic

See also
 Men's
Turkey Men's national volleyball team
Turkey Men's national volleyball team U23
Turkey Men's national volleyball team U21
Turkey Men's national volleyball team U19
 Women's
 Turkey Women's national volleyball team
Turkey Women's national volleyball team U23
Turkey Women's national volleyball team U20
Turkey Women's national volleyball team U18

References

External links
Official website
FIVB profile
CEV profile

Turkey Men
Men national
Men's sport in Turkey